Emine Ülker Tarhan (born 29 November 1963) is a Turkish jurist and politician formerly from the Republican People's Party (Turkish: Cumhuriyet Halk Partisi, CHP). She was formerly a judge at the High Court of Appeals. She served as the vice spokesperson of her party in the parliament before resigning on 31 October 2014. She founded the Anatolia Party on 14 November 2014 and led it until its disestablishment in December 2015.

Tarhan was born in Tarsus, Mersin. She was educated at the Ankara University Law School. After working as a freelance lawyer, she became a public defender. She served as a judge at the High Court of Appeals.

Tarhan was a founding member of the Judges' and Prosecutors' Association (YARSAV). She served as its secretary general and chairperson.

She joined the Republican People's Party (CHP), and entered the Turkish Grand National Assembly as a deputy from Ankara after the general elections on June 12, 2011.

Tarhan is married and has two children.

She is an outspoken supporter of the 2013 protests and on one occasion sat on the ground to prevent a water cannon vehicle passing, an act for which the pianist Fazıl Say suggested that she take over the leadership of the CHP.

On 31 October 2014, Tarhan resigned from the CHP, citing the weak leadership and the lack of strong electoral prospects as her reason. As a prominent nationalist, her intentions have also been attributed to the more liberal approaches taken by party leader Kemal Kılıçdaroğlu.

References

External links
Emine Ülker Tarhan  TBMM 

1963 births
Ankara University Faculty of Law alumni
Living people
People from Tarsus, Mersin
Republican People's Party (Turkey) politicians
Turkish judges
21st-century Turkish lawyers
Female party leaders of Turkey
Members of the 24th Parliament of Turkey
21st-century Turkish women politicians
Turkish political party founders
Public defenders